Bymidten is a central neighbourhood of  Odense, in Funen, Denmark.

References

Suburbs of Odense